Maravanpatti is a small village in Pudukkottai district, between Alangudi and Karamakudi,  located 30 km from Pudukottai Busstand and 15 km from Alangudi. Maravanpatti is administered under Alangudi Taluk but the postal center is Vadakadu.

Temple 
Every year on the full moon day of Cithirai the festival of Chithirai Thiruvizha is celebrated for Shree Kudikaatha Amman among the village people. This is a three-day festival. Anyone who has left the village for work comes back home to the village.  Several cultural programs are hosted in the temple ground, with each program sponsored a member of a  village family.  The temple was planned to renovate in April, 2010, but unfortunately it was stopped due to some reasons.

Villages in Pudukkottai district